East Carbon is a city in Carbon County, Utah, United States. The population was 1,301 at the 2010 census. East Carbon was incorporated on July 23, 1973, from the merger of the two struggling mining towns of Dragerton and Columbia. On January 1, 2014, the city annexed the neighboring city of Sunnyside.

Geography
East Carbon is located southeast of the center of Carbon County at  (39.542569, -110.418934).

Demographics

At the 2000 census, there were 1,393 people, 562 households and 384 families residing in the city. The population density was 156.0 per square mile (60.2/km2). There were 734 housing units at an average density of 82.2 per square mile (31.7/km2). The racial makeup of the city was 81.12% White, 0.14% African American, 0.65% Native American, 0.14% Asian, 15.65% from other races, and 2.30% from two or more races. Hispanic or Latino of any race were 20.82% of the population.

There were 562 households, of which 29.4% had children under 18 living with them, 50.7% were married couples living together, 13.3% had a ‘single’ female householder, and 31.5% were non-families. 27.4% of all households were made up of individuals, and 16.9% had someone living alone who was 65 years of age or older. The average household size was 2.48, and the average family size was 3.01.

26.2% of the population were under 18, 7.1% from 18 to 24, 23.0% from 25 to 44, 24.3% from 45 to 64, and 19.5% were 65 years of age or older. The median age was 41 years. For every 100 females, there were 92.1 males. For every 100 females aged 18 and over, there were 89.3 males.

The median household income was $25,313, and the median family income was $31,019. Males had a median income of $31,667 and females $21,912. The per capita income was $14,093. About 11.7% of families and 16.9% of the population were below the poverty line, including 18.6% of those under age 18 and 8.2% of those aged 65 or over.

History

East Carbon City began in the fall of 1942 when the U.S. government – through the Defense Plant Corporation – awarded a contract to the W.E. Ryberg-Strong-Grant Corporation of Springville, Utah to develop the town at a planned cost of $5 million. It was originally named "Drager", after W.L. Drager, chief engineer for the Defense Plant Corporation, who was raised in Utah and later moved to Washington, D.C.

On September 9, 1942, the Post Office moved into its new building, and during the ceremonies, Postmistress Agnes Scow announced the U.S Post Office Department would not allow the name of Drager. It contended that Drager was too similar to the name Draper (another Utah community) and would create confusion and delays in mail delivery. A selected group of citizens gathered in the school auditorium to discuss a new name from the proposals of "Dragerville", "Dragervale" or "Drager Town" offered by the Post Office Department. "Dragerton", a derivative of "Drager-town", was selected.

In 1959, with the area near its peak population, the Carbon School District built a high school in the area. The school was placed on land within the Sunnyside city limits that bordered Dragerton. The land was donated by Kaiser Steel, a local mining company. In 1958, during an assembly at East Carbon Junior High School, a vote was taken to give the new high school a name and mascot. The name selected was East Carbon High School, and the mascot was a Viking. The school colors were blue, white and red.

When the town was incorporated in 1973, the name was officially changed to "East Carbon City", matching the high school name.

In 2005, the high school was closed and demolished before the beginning of the new school year. Bruin Point Elementary School was built the following year and is the only school serving the area of East Carbon.

Columbia
As part of East Carbon's incorporation, the nearby town of Columbia (approximately 4 miles to the southeast) became part of the new city. However, the area is still referred to as "Columbia" by residents.

See also

 List of cities and towns in Utah

References

External links

 

Cities in Carbon County, Utah
Mining communities in Utah
1973 establishments in Utah